Evan Almighty is a 2007 American comedy film, and a spin-off of Bruce Almighty (2003). The film was directed by Tom Shadyac, written by Steve Oedekerk, based on the characters created by Steve Koren and Mark O'Keefe from the original film. It stars Steve Carell and Morgan Freeman reprising their roles as Evan Baxter and God, respectively, with new cast members Lauren Graham and John Goodman. The film is a modern-day retelling of Noah's Ark, which Evan reluctantly re-enacts because God commands him to do so and will stop at nothing to make him do it even as Evan pursues a new career in government.

Production of the film began in January 2006. Several visual effect companies were used to provide CGI for the numerous animals and the climactic flood scene. By the time the film had completed production, it had become the most expensive live-action comedy film ever, later being overtaken by Men in Black 3. In October 2007, the film was released on DVD and HD DVD.

The film opened on June 22, 2007, and was a box-office bomb, grossing $174.4 million worldwide, and received generally negative reviews from critics.

Plot
Newly elected to Congress, former local television news reporter Evan Baxter leaves his hometown of Buffalo, New York from the original Bruce Almighty, and later moves to the community of Prestige Crest, located in the fictional town of Huntsville, Virginia, where his congressional campaign officially declares that he will change the world. Evan prays to God to give him this opportunity. His wife, Joan, also prays that she, Evan, and their three sons will be closer together as a family. On his first day working at Congress, Evan receives a letter from his greedy boss, Congressman Chuck Long, who provides him with a prime office and gives the opportunity to join him as the junior co-sponsor to his Citizens' Integration of Public Lands Act (CINPLAN) bill. Over the next several days, strange events in Evan's life occur:

 Eight vacant lots in Prestige Crest are purchased under his name, and ancient tools and gopher wood are delivered there
 Pairs of animals start following him around everywhere he goes, with birds flying into his office through the window
 He begins to grow a beard, which grows back whenever he shaves it every morning
 His hair grows uncontrollably
 His clothes are replaced with robes.
 The number 614 starts appearing in various forms throughout his daily routines

Evan comes to realize that 614 actually refers to verse 14 in chapter 6 of the Book of Genesis, where God instructs Noah to build an ark in preparation for a coming flood. Although Evan initially rejects this idea, God himself starts appearing to Evan and assures him that a flood will come and the only way he can change the world will be through building the ark. Evan decides to start building the ark with the tools and materials provided, giving him an opportunity to get closer to his sons, although Joan sees this as a midlife crisis.

Although Evan still maintains his career in Congress, his appearance alienates his three staffers and the animals that follow him everywhere become disruptive. God reappears to Evan and provides him a robe, and later warns him the flood will likely come mid-day on September 22. When God indefinitely exposes Evan's robe, Long fires him from Congress and has his name removed from the Public Land Act bill. Believing that Evan has gone insane, Joan leaves him behind, causing Evan to continue building the ark alone. Meanwhile, God disguises himself as a waiter in a restaurant and later speaks to Joan. God assures Joan that she should see this as an opportunity for the entire family to get closer to each other. Joan is inspired and finally returns to help Evan finish building the ark together to prepare for the flood.

On September 22, Evan's three staffers show him evidence that Long had planned to build Prestige Crest after damming off a nearby water source, but Long had cut many corners in building the dam. They suspect Long would do the same with the Public Land Act Bill. With the ark finally complete, the animals board two by two, the police threaten to destroy it with a wrecking ball as it violates land codes, and rain falls. Evan realizes that the flood will be a result of Long's dam failing, and warns the onlookers to get aboard the ark. The dam indeed fails, destroying all the homes of Prestige Crest. The ark rides the flood down the streets of Washington, D.C. and comes to a halt in front of the Capitol, interrupting the vote for the Public Land Act Bill. The flood results in Evan accusing Long of being responsible for cost-cutting leading to the dam's failure, leading to several other members of Congress voting against the bill. Congress investigates Long for profiteering and all the animals return to their natural habitats. Evan is reinstated to Congress after the flood, and the changes imposed onto him by God no longer remain. Evan re-encounters God during a family hike. God states that Evan had changed his world as he prayed for and being closer to his family through his one Act of Random Kindness (ARK).

At the end of the film, God reveals a new commandment to the outgoing audience: "Thou shalt do the dance", followed by the film's cast and crew members dancing to the C+C Music Factory song "Gonna Make You Sweat (Everybody Dance Now)" during the closing credits.

Cast

Production

Screenplay
The film's screenplay was originally titled The Passion of the Ark and was written by Bobby Florsheim and Josh Stolberg. It became the subject of a seven-studio bidding war in April 2004. The script was sold to Sony Pictures in a deal worth $2.5 million plus a percentage of the profits, a record for a spec script from previously unproduced writers. Universal Studios immediately made a deal to co-produce the script with Sony and have Steve Oedekerk rewrite it into the sequel to Bruce Almighty. Steve Oedekerk had been involved with Bruce Almighty as an executive producer and co-writer of the screenplay (with Steve Koren and Mark O'Keefe, who wrote the story).  The studio later discarded the original The Passion of the Ark script completely, and Oedekerk fashioned a new script from scratch (only he received final credit on the finished film as screenwriter). Jim Carrey was asked to reprise his role as Bruce in the sequel and, when he declined, director Tom Shadyac convinced Steve Carell to accept the leading role. Shadyac, reflecting on the first film, stated "[Carell] delivered some of the funniest stuff in the movie. We thought, 'Why not take that character and spin him off into a different film?'"

Casting
Jim Carrey declined to reprise his role from the original Bruce Almighty. Although Carrey did act in a sequel to Ace Ventura: Pet Detective, he has said that he is "not a big fan of doing the same character twice." This marked the third time a sequel has been made to a film for which Carrey declined to reprise his role—the others being Dumb and Dumberer and Son of the Mask.

Budget
The initial budget, at approximately $140 million, led Evan Almighty to become the most expensive comedy film ever made. Added costs such as set construction, visual effects, and problems with filming multiple animals in a controlled location brought the budget up to $175 million. Once marketing for the film was also included, the film's entire spend was estimated to be around $200 million. The ballooning budget caused Sony to drop the project and hand it over entirely to Universal Studios. Part of the budget was Carell's payroll, where he earned a reported $5 million for his leading role. The Virginia Film Office estimates the film brought $20–25 million to Virginia, with the majority of it in the Charlottesville area. Universal defended the cost of the film, saying it was "designed as a four-quadrant film, and therefore poised for bigger [box office] returns than typical comedies."

Ark design and construction

Construction of the ark began in January 2006 and the scenes involving the ark were shot in a Crozet, Virginia subdivision called Old Trail. The ark's layout was also based on pictures in several children's books that crew members had read in their childhoods. When the characters were filmed during the day building the ark or were on location elsewhere, crew members would further construct the ark at night. A concrete base was built to support the weight of the large ark; after filming was completed, the ark was taken down in a week, and the base in another week.

In disassembling the set, everything that was salvageable from the ark was donated to Habitat for Humanity. "Leave no trace" was the slogan used by the director as part of the DVD's bonus features, "The Almighty Green Set".

Costumes and filming locations

To create Evan's beard and long hair, three designers would take three hours each day adding individual hairs using prosthetic adhesive and making Carell wear custom wigs. The wigs consisted of both human and yak hair. With his new look, Carell was sometimes nicknamed "Mountain Man", "Retrosexual", or "Unabomber." For his costumes, designers spoke with textile experts, researched historical information on the clothing that was likely worn at the time of Noah, and used aged fibers for the clothing.

Scenes for the film were filmed in various locations in Virginia, including areas in and around Crozet, Waynesboro, Richmond, Charlottesville, and Staunton, though some filming did take place at Universal Studios in Hollywood, California.

Effects
For the CGI used throughout the film, companies Rhythm & Hues (R&H) and Industrial Light & Magic (ILM) developed different parts of the film. R&H focused on the animation of the animals, while ILM completed the final scene of the ark rushing through Washington D.C. Lindy De Quattro, the ILM associate visual effects supervisor, revealed that "This is the first time where we had to do a whole series of shots that were happening mid-day, where you were going to get a really long look at the water and what it was doing." The company initially experienced problems creating the water effects and had to develop new tools which would choreograph the movements of the water. In addition, ILM used similar tools that were used on their prior film Poseidon. Lighting was also an issue as the characters on the ark had been filmed on a greenscreen stage, and the visual effects company had to ensure that the lighting matched that of the characters and the outside setting. Details were added to the ark for long-distance shots to make the design of the ark more appealing and relate the ark's size to scale in comparison to the amount of water. To complete the scene, ILM used thirty to sixty crew members and produced 200 shots over a yearlong period between April 2006 and May 2007.

Rhythm & Hues created 300 pairs of animals for use on the ark and fifteen pairs with higher detail for closeup shots. R&H was also assisted by C.I.S. Hollywood, another visual effects company, who provided a large number of composites, involving hundreds of greenscreen animal elements. In scenes where there are multiple species of animals, crew members would film the animals on the greenscreen and R&H and C.I.S would digitally add the animals one at a time, sometimes taking several weeks to a couple of months. Andy Arnett, the animation supervisor, declared that "The research was extensive. It took six or seven months to perfect the look and feel of the animals before we had the first shot out the door."

For the scene in Congressman Long's office, CGI was used the entire time for the fish that follow Evan around from the fish tank. Cafe FX, the visual effects company hired for the scene, ordered ten different kinds of tropical fish from a local store and studied their movements to imitate them on screen using computer animation. Jeff Goldman, the visual effects supervisor, stated "Early in the sequence, we mimicked the actual behavior of the fish in our animation, but as the scene plays out, the fish are a counterpoint to Steve Carell's comedic timing."

Marketing
In late May during production, the media learned that director Tom Shadyac angrily complained to producers, saying "I'm not seeing any ads, and I don't know why. I'm not getting answers. People are giving me information that isn't true ... I'm only hearing about all the other summer movies, and nothing about mine." Shadyac also fired his marketing consultants that he had used for prior films due to his thoughts over the mishandling of the marketing. He later apologized for his outburst with producers, and claimed that it was as a result of his nervousness before the film's release.

Grace Hill Media, a marketing firm that targets religious Americans and was also used for marketing Bruce Almighty, The Da Vinci Code, and The Passion of the Christ; held exclusive screenings of the film in mid-June in fifty cities in the United States to reach religious moviegoers. Grace Hill provided free screenings to blogs in exchange for publicity on the blogs. The film and its subsequent home video release was marketed to Christians and their churches through a "kindness campaign" called Ark ALMIGHTY.

The first trailer of the film premiered on March 29, 2007 for a marathon of The Office, which also stars Steve Carell and Ed Helms. For online advertising, an eight-minute clip of a scene was released on Yahoo! two days before the release of the film.

Environmental impact 
Director Tom Shadyac felt the film reflected environmental themes of how humans are stewards of God's creation. In keeping with the themes, Evan Almighty became NBC Universal's first film to offset the production's carbon emissions. Producer Michael Bostick revealed how the emissions were offset:

We worked closely with The Conservation Fund to calculate our carbon emissions from what we used on the movie—whether from vehicles used or any of the construction equipment. Once our carbon emissions were calculated, we planted trees that will effectively zero out our climate-changing footprint left behind from the movie.

Shadyac accomplished this by requiring crew members to plant 2,050 trees at the Rappahannock River Valley National Wildlife Refuge in Warsaw, Virginia and the San Joaquin River National Wildlife Refuge near Modesto, California. He also bought over 400 bikes for all the cast and crew, to get to work instead of driving. In addition, rather than simply demolishing sets, Shadyac tried to donate houses built for the production and had the Ark set recycled, by donating materials to Habitat for Humanity. During the premiere of the film for cast and crew at Universal Citywalk, the attendees were encouraged to donate to a campaign to plant trees in forests around the world. The after party used recycled cups and plates to offset the use of resources. Shadyac also required that when Industrial Light & Magic developed the climactic scene, that the CGI flood did not appear to harm any of the trees in the scene.

The film partnered with the website Get On Board Now, which focused on the importance of conservation during production of the film. Donations were taken at the website for The Conservation Fund, which paid for the planting of 15,000 trees.

Animal welfare

The American Humane Association oversaw the 177 species of animals that were used in the film. In scenes including both predators and prey, the animals were digitally added instead to ensure their safety. The American Humane Association gave its permission for the film to display "No animals were harmed in the making of this movie" over the closing credits.

PETA accused the film's producers of using animals that had previously been abused. Two chimpanzees who appear in the film, Cody and Sable, were surrendered by their owner to settle a lawsuit that documented allegations of beatings and mistreatment. PETA was also critical of Birds & Animals Unlimited, the primary animal supplier to the film, for alleged serious and continuing violations of the U.S. Animal Welfare Act, including failure to comply with veterinary care requirements and failure to provide shelter from heat and sunlight, which PETA details and claims it can document.

The film's director, Tom Shadyac, said of PETA's criticisms "many of these animals have been rescued from other situations and can't be returned to the wild" and "There's a certain amount of hypocrisy whenever you work with animals, even to show, which we hope we're showing, that respect of all of God's creation ... I don't know. I respect their criticism." 
A Universal Studios spokesperson declared:
The live animals used in the filming of Evan Almighty were supplemented by a great number of computer-generated animals, but it would have been impossible to depend on CGI exclusively as some key scenes in the film demonstrate the need for peaceful and productive co-existence between man and animals. One of the most prominent, inescapable messages of the film is the responsibility that humans have to protect and care for animals.

Release

Theatrical
The premiere for the film was held on June 10, 2007 and guests included Adam Sandler, David Hasselhoff, Kate Flannery, Eddie Murphy, Kevin James, and Mindy Kaling, among others.

Home media
The film was released on HD DVD and DVD on October 9, 2007 and was the fourth-most rented DVD of the week earning $6.4 million. In the film's first six weeks of release it earned $27,676,676 in domestic DVD sales. The HD-DVD and DVD's special features include deleted scenes, outtakes, cast interviews, and footage of the animals used in the film. The film was released on Blu-ray on August 7, 2012.

Proposed ban
Malaysia's Muslim Consumers Association (PPIM) called for a ban on the film, claiming it is offensive to Islam. Secretary-General Maamor Osman claimed that the film was depicting the great flood as comedy and characterized God with the portrayal of a human, both of which are considered blasphemous in Islam. Similarly there was some public protest against Bruce Almighty being shown in theaters, but that movie was released on DVD and was also shown on television broadcasts. Evan Almighty was still released in Malaysia on August 23, 2007.

Reception

Box office
Though Evan Almighty was well hyped, especially with churchgoers, and had double the budget of Bruce Almighty, it performed under expectations. On its first weekend, it opened in 5,200 screens in 3,604 theaters and earned $31.1 million (on its first two days the film earned $11.4 million followed by $8.3 million on Sunday). The opening was less than half of the first film's $68 million weekend ($85 million counting Memorial Day). Nikki Rocco, the president of distribution for Universal Pictures declared, "We never expected it to be much higher ... it is not unusual for family films to open at a level like this and build. This film will have legs." The film managed to remain at the third spot at the box office in its second week, before dropping to fifth place in its third week.

Internationally, the film also opened in first place in Russia and Ukraine, earning $1.5 million in Russia with 329 venues and $179,000 in Ukraine at 64 locations. The gross in the opening weekends for the two countries was 10% and 11%, respectively, bigger than the opening for Bruce Almighty. Altogether, the film earned $173,418,781 worldwide with $100,462,298 in the U.S. and $72,956,483 in the international box office.

According to Box Office Mojo, the film is the second highest-grossing film in the category "Supernatural Comedies with Religious Elements", directly behind Bruce Almighty.

Critical response
Evan Almighty received generally negative reviews from critics. On Rotten Tomatoes, the film has an approval rating of 24%, based on 194 reviews, with an average rating of 4.5/10. The site's critical consensus reads, "Big on special effects but short on laughs, Evan Almighty underutilizes a star-studded cast that includes Steve Carell and Morgan Freeman." On Metacritic the film has a weighted average score of 37 out of 100, based on reviews from 33 critics, indicating "generally unfavorable reviews". Audiences polled by CinemaScore gave the film an average grade of "A−" on an A+ to F scale.

Critic Richard Roeper commended Jim Carrey for declining to reprise his role in "three of the worst sequels of all time", which included Dumb and Dumberer: When Harry Met Lloyd, Son of the Mask and Evan Almighty. He continued: "Evan Almighty is a paper-thin alleged comedy with a laugh drought of biblical proportions, and a condescendingly simplistic spiritual message." Several reviewers credit Carell's performance to significantly improving the humor of the film. Peter Travers of Rolling Stone gave it 1 out of 4, calling it "shamelessly juvenile, pseudo-religious, mock-sincere" and "not that funny". He praised Carell "who projects the movie’s only sense of mischief. But it’s too little and too late." He later included it on his list of the Worst Movies of 2007.

Awards

Before Evan Almighty was released, it was nominated for "Best Summer Movie You Haven't Seen Yet" at the 2007 MTV Movie Awards. Competing against seven other nominees, it lost to Transformers. At the Golden Raspberry Awards Evan Almighty was nominated for the Worst Prequel or Sequel, but lost to Daddy Day Camp.

Soundtrack

Evan Almighty: Music from and Inspired by the Motion Picture debuted in 2007. The soundtrack debuted on June 19, 2007. "Revolution" was performed by Rascal Flatts in the film. Their version is not on the soundtrack, but it appears as a bonus track on their album Still Feels Good. Also not included on the soundtrack are Elton John's 2006 hit, "Just Like Noah's Ark" of which only a little bit is heard during the start of building the ark, and John Mayer's "Waiting on the World to Change", used in the main ark-building montage. "Ready For a Miracle" was released as a single for the soundtrack by American country pop recording artist, LeAnn Rimes.

Rascal Flatts' version of "Revolution" peaked at number 57 on the Hot Country Songs charts, and "The Power of One" by Bomshel reached number 52 on the same.

The soundtrack was nominated for a Dove Award for Special Event Album of the Year at the 39th GMA Dove Awards. The song "Be the Miracle" by Room for Two was also nominated for Contemporary Recorded Song of the Year while "Ready for a Miracle" by LeAnn Rimes won the Dove Award for Traditional Gospel Recorded Song of the Year.

 Note: Tracks one, two and fourteen to sixteen are taken from the film while tracks three through thirteen are inspired by the film.

References

External links

 
 

2007 films
2007 comedy films
2000s English-language films
2000s fantasy comedy films
American fantasy comedy films
American sequel films
Film spin-offs
Films scored by John Debney
Films about politicians
Films directed by Tom Shadyac
Films produced by Neal H. Moritz
Films produced by Roger Birnbaum
Films set in Virginia
Films set in Washington, D.C.
Films shot in Los Angeles
Films shot in Virginia
Films shot in Washington, D.C.
Fiction about God
Fiction about government
Noah's Ark in film
Original Film films
Relativity Media films
Religious comedy films
Films about Christianity
Films with screenplays by Steve Oedekerk
Films with screenplays by Joel Cohen
Films with screenplays by Alec Sokolow
Spyglass Entertainment films
Universal Pictures films
2000s American films